Eric Allan Kramer (born March 26, 1962) is an American actor and fight choreographer. Kramer has appeared in numerous feature films and television programs including True Romance and Robin Hood: Men in Tights and is also known for his performances as Thor in The Incredible Hulk Returns (1988), and as Scott Miller on AMC's Lodge 49 but is best known for his role as Dave Rogers on The Hughleys and Bob Duncan on Good Luck Charlie from 2010–2014. He also appeared as Iron Mike Wilcox in the 2019 video game Days Gone.

Early life
Kramer's father, Roger Kramer, is a former CFL player. Kramer attended the BFA program at the University of Alberta in Edmonton, which led to acting in the theater and some television and movie roles, as well as a career in fight choreography.

Career
In 1987, Kramer made his acting debut in television film The Gunfighters. He also starred in the 1990 film Quest for the Mighty Sword, replacing previous lead actor Miles O'Keeffe. He played Thor in NBC's television film The Incredible Hulk Returns and a Russian baseball player in the television movie The Comrades of Summer. Among Kramer's more notable roles have been Little John in Robin Hood: Men in Tights, Bear in American Wedding, and Boris, bodyguard to producer Lee Donowitz, in True Romance. He has also appeared in a number of notable television series, including Two and a Half Men, Wizards of Waverly Place, Growing Pains, Cheers, Empty Nest, Blossom, CSI: Crime Scene Investigation, NewsRadio, JAG, Roseanne, Murder, She Wrote, Seinfeld, That '70s Show, Ellen, Monk, Jack and Bobby, Phil of the Future, How I Met Your Mother, The King of Queens, My Name Is Earl, and Will and Grace (where he was in the same episode as his Good Luck Charlie wife Leigh-Allyn Baker). Kramer was also a series regular on the sitcom Bob as Whitey van de Bunt (1993) and the ABC/UPN sitcom The Hughleys as Dave Rogers.

Kramer continues to work on the stage as a member of the Antaeus Classical Rep Company in Los Angeles and received an Ovatti Award nomination for his role in The Wood Demon. He also co-starred as Bob Duncan on the Disney Channel sitcom Good Luck Charlie. He also played Link's dad in the Nickelodeon series The Thundermans.

Filmography

Films

Television

Video games

References

External links

1962 births
Living people
20th-century American male actors
21st-century American male actors
American male film actors
American male stage actors
American male television actors
Male actors from Grand Rapids, Michigan
University of Alberta alumni